The Little Wolf Mountains,  el. , is a small mountain range southwest of Colstrip, Montana in Big Horn County, Montana.

See also
 List of mountain ranges in Montana

Notes

Mountain ranges of Montana
Landforms of Big Horn County, Montana